Lateral to the conjoint tendon, previously known as the inguinal aponeurotic falx, there is a ligamentous band originating from the lower margin of the transversalis fascia and extending down in front of the inferior epigastric artery to the superior ramus of the pubis; it is termed the interfoveolar ligament of Hesselbach and sometimes contains a few muscular fibers.

It is named for Franz Kaspar Hesselbach.

References

Ligaments
Muscular system